Jacob Letterstedt (December 15, 1796 – March 18, 1862), born Lallerstedt in Östergötland, was a Swedish businessman who settled in the Cape Colony (part of present-day South Africa). He arrived at Cape Town in 1820, where he made his fortune in the grain trade. Later he founded the company that became South African Breweries. In 1839 he was appointed acting Consul of Sweden-Norway, in 1841 ordinary Consul and in 1857 Consul General.

Letterstedt donated money to several prizes and to the Letterstedt Association, which promotes Nordic cooperation. In 1860, he was elected a member of the Royal Swedish Academy of Sciences. The same year he returned to Europe and was living in Paris at the time of his death.

References

External links 

 Jacob Letterstedt in Riksarkivet
 

Swedish businesspeople
1796 births
1862 deaths
Members of the Royal Swedish Academy of Sciences
Swedish emigrants to South Africa